V is a 2021 Indian Tamil-language language horror drama film directed by DaVinci Saravanan and starring Raaghav and Luthiya in the lead roles. Produced by Roopesh Kumar, it was released on 8 January 2021.

Cast 
Raaghav as Madhav
Luthiya as Kanika
Sabitha Anand
R. N. R. Manohar
Rishi
Ashwini
Nima
Sathya Das
Filjiya
Rineesh
Divian
Devasurya

Production
The film was shot in 2015, with an audio launch event held in Chennai during September 2015. Actors from the Tamil film industry such as Bobby Simha and Abi Saravanan attended the event.

Release 
The film was released across theatres in Tamil Nadu on 8 January 2021. National film critic Malini Mannath noted "surprisingly it managed to deliver much more than what one would have expected", adding "with hardly any lagging moments or wasted shots, the crisp story telling keeps one occupied for the most part". A reviewer from Maalai Malar noted that the film was "different". Reviews from film portals, Chennai City News and Film News 24x7 were also positive.

References 

2021 films
2020s Tamil-language films
2020s horror drama films
Indian horror drama films
2021 horror films
2021 drama films